Erin Nicole Volcán Smith (born January 12, 1984) is an international backstroke and individual medley swimmer from Venezuela. She is a former South American record holder, and current (2009) Venezuelan record holder. She swam for Venezuela at the 2008 Olympics.

She attended Auburn University in Auburn, Alabama, United States, where she competed for the Auburn Tigers swimming and diving team. She was also on the U.S. team for the 2003 Summer Univerisade team, where she won a bronze medal in the 200-meter backstroke.

At the 2006 Central American and Caribbean Games she set a new games record in the 200 back (2:16.65), bettering a 20-year-old record set by Silvia Poll at the 1986 Games.

She has swum at:
2003 Summer Universiade
2006 Central American & Caribbean Games
2007 World Championships
2007 Pan American Games
2008 Olympics

References

External links

Living people
1984 births
Sportspeople from Long Beach, California
Auburn Tigers women's swimmers
Venezuelan female swimmers
Olympic swimmers of Venezuela
Swimmers at the 2008 Summer Olympics
Swimmers at the 2007 Pan American Games
Pan American Games medalists in swimming
Pan American Games bronze medalists for Venezuela
Universiade medalists in swimming
Central American and Caribbean Games gold medalists for Venezuela
Central American and Caribbean Games silver medalists for Venezuela
Central American and Caribbean Games bronze medalists for Venezuela
South American Games gold medalists for Venezuela
South American Games silver medalists for Venezuela
South American Games bronze medalists for Venezuela
South American Games medalists in swimming
Competitors at the 2006 South American Games
Competitors at the 2006 Central American and Caribbean Games
Universiade bronze medalists for the United States
Central American and Caribbean Games medalists in swimming
Medalists at the 2003 Summer Universiade
Medalists at the 2007 Pan American Games
20th-century Venezuelan women
21st-century Venezuelan women